Giannis Kalmazidis (born 16 June 1968) is a Greek-Swedish retired volleyball player and current coach of Panathinaikos women's volleyball team. He played for national level for Sweden and was competed in the men's tournament at the 1988 Summer Olympics. He was also member of the team who won the silver medal in 1989 European Championship.

References

External links
 
 
 Coach profile at Greekvolley.gr

1968 births
Living people
Swedish men's volleyball players
Greek men's volleyball players
Greek volleyball coaches
Olympic volleyball players of Sweden
Swedish people of Greek  descent
Volleyball players at the 1988 Summer Olympics
Sportspeople from Budapest